William Doolittle may refer to:

 William H. Doolittle (1848–1914), U.S. Representative from Washington
 William E. Doolittle (born 1947), American geographer